Luma Arcade was a video game developer with origins in South Africa. The company was founded in 2006 and is headquartered in San Francisco, with development offices in Johannesburg and a satellite office in Portland.

History
Luma Arcade was a developer of video games from 2006 to 2013. Initially a division of Luma Studios, a South African animation services provider, Luma Arcade was later spun out as an independent company with staff in San Francisco, Johannesburg, and Portland before being acquired in a private sale in 2013 to an undisclosed buyer.

Games Developed

References

Video game development companies
Video game companies established in 2006
Companies based in Johannesburg
Video game companies of South Africa